Enanthyperythra is a genus of moths in the family Geometridae.

Species
 Enanthyperythra legataria (Herrich-Schäffer, [1852])

References
 Enanthyperythra at Markku Savela's Lepidoptera and Some Other Life Forms
 Natural History Museum Lepidoptera genus database

Ourapterygini